Christopher Edgar Napitulu (born December 22, 2002) is an Indonesian singer who won The Voice Kids Indonesia of season 1, where he join and mentored by Tulus, and signed with Universal Music Indonesia.

Life and career
Christopher Edgar Napitulu was born on December 22, 2002, in Bandung, West Java to parents Henry Yo Napit and Julia De. He also perform in a musical drama theater which produced by Mira Lesmana in, titled Laskar Pelangi where his role as Lintang.

Before auditioned to the competition singer, he was joined a children's talent program which under by Erwin Gutawa and Gita Gutawa, Di Atas Rata-Rata of first generation, for developing his singing talent.

The Voice Kids Indonesia

On October 14, 2016, he became a contestant on season 1 of The Voice Kids Indonesia and sang "Grenade" for his blind audition performance. Two coaches, Tulus, and Agnez Mo turned their chairs for him and he chose Tulus as his coach. In the battle rounds, Christo was up against Michelle Celine and Rahadila Putri with the song "Treasure (Bruno Mars song)" by Bruno Mars. Christo went on to sing through the live shows, where he performed his finale song "Fix You" by Coldplay. On December 2, 2016, Christo was crowned the first season winner of The Voice Kids Indonesia. He became the first winner of this singing talent show.

Performances

References 

2002 births
Living people
People from Bandung
21st-century Indonesian male singers
Indonesian pop singers